In taxonomy, the Methanosarcinaceae are a family of the Methanosarcinales.

Phylogeny
The currently accepted taxonomy is based on the List of Prokaryotic names with Standing in Nomenclature (LPSN) and National Center for Biotechnology Information (NCBI)

Biochemistry 
A notable trait of Methanosarcinaceae is that they are methanogens that incorporate the unusual amino acid pyrrolysine into their enzymes. The enzyme monomethylamine methyltransferase catalyzes the reaction of monomethylamine to methane. This enzyme includes pyrrolysine. The unusual amino acid is inserted using a unique tRNA, the anticodon of which is UAG. In most organisms, and in most Methanosarcinaceae proteins, UAG is a stop codon. However in this enzyme, and anywhere else pyrrolysine is incorporated, likely through contextual markers on the mRNA, the pyrrolysine-loaded tRNA is inserted instead of the release factor. They also have a unique aminoacyl-tRNA synthetase to specifically load this tRNA with pyrrolysine. This unique adaptation is still the subject of significant study.

See also
 List of Archaea genera

References

Further reading

Scientific journals

Scientific books

Scientific databases

External links

Archaea taxonomic families
Euryarchaeota